Laura Viviana Sturgeon (born February 15, 1965) is an American politician. She is a member of the Delaware Senate for District 4 and the first Latina to serve in the Delaware General Assembly.

Early life and career
Sturgeon was born in Florida and raised in Delaware. Her parents were immigrants from Argentina. She graduated from Brandywine High School and received her bachelor's and master's degrees at the University of Delaware. She taught in Delaware public schools for over 20 years and served as a leader in the Delaware State Education Association (DSEA), the largest union in Delaware.

Political career
Sturgeon was active in community groups and nonprofit organizations but had never held public office prior to challenging Republican incumbent Greg Lavelle, who had been in the General Assembly for 18 years, where he served as Senate Minority Whip. The race between the two was considered a key race to watch in 2018. Sturgeon was endorsed by former Vice President Joe Biden.

On November 6, 2018, Sturgeon defeated Lavelle by winning 11,251 votes (53%) in the general election. Her victory was a major upset and was one of several losses for prominent Republicans in Delaware.

On November 8th, 2022, Sturgeon won reelection to serve a two-year term.  She defeated Republican challenger Ted Kittila by winning 10,762 votes (56.6%).

References

External links
Official page at the Delaware General Assembly
Campaign site
 

1965 births
Living people
Democratic Party Delaware state senators
21st-century American women politicians
21st-century American politicians
Women state legislators in Delaware
American people of Argentine descent
Hispanic and Latino American state legislators